Ken Tanaka may refer to:

 Ken Tanaka (actor), Japanese actor
 Ken Tanaka, a character from the TV Series Glee
 Ken Tanaka, the protagonist in the mystery novels by Dale Furutani.